was a Japanese Nihonga painter.

He was friends with Tamako Kataoka (1905–2008). He was awarded the Order of Culture.

Works

See also 
 Seison Maeda (1885–1977), one of the leading Nihonga painters
 List of Nihonga painters

References

External links 

 Artnet | Kobayashi Kokei
 Google Cultural Institute | Kobayashi Kokei

1883 births
1957 deaths
Nihonga painters
Buddhist artists
People from Niigata Prefecture
Recipients of the Order of Culture
20th-century Japanese painters
Imperial household artists